The 2010 Giro d'Italia was the 93rd edition of the Giro d'Italia, one of cycling's Grand Tours. The race started off in Amsterdam on 8 May and stayed in the Netherlands for three stages, before leaving the country. The route included climbs such as Monte Zoncolan, Plan de Corones, the Passo del Mortirolo and the Passo di Gavia before ending in Verona with an individual time trial.

After three weeks of racing, it was Basso who claimed his second Giro d'Italia title, after also winning in 2006. Australian riders won all the lesser jersey awards, with Evans taking the points classification, 's Matthew Lloyd the winner of the mountains classification, and Richie Porte of  the Giro's best young rider.

The road race stages in the Netherlands were both marred by repeated crashes, which led to some unexpected big time gaps before the transfer to Italy. The overall standings were very turbulent in the first week, with four different riders holding the race leader's pink jersey. The 11th stage greatly re-shaped the overall standings, when several riders, including Sastre, gained almost 13 minutes against the remainder of the field. Porte took the pink jersey after this stage. Two days later, Arroyo took the jersey, and kept it for five days. He eventually lost it to Basso on the first of two very difficult mountain stages to close out the Giro. Success was fairly widespread among the Giro's 22 teams, as 17 of them came away with either a stage win, classification win, or stint in the pink jersey.

Teams

The 22 teams in the race were announced on 22 March. Sixteen teams were guaranteed a place in the race by virtue of a September 2008 agreement between the UCI and the organizers of the season's three Grand Tours. Those guaranteed a place are those who were members of the UCI ProTour at the time of the agreement. Two new teams joined the ProTour for 2010. One, participated in the race, but the other, did not wish to participate, since they planned to send their best riders to the partially concurrent Tour of California. Seven UCI Professional Continental teams, two of which ( and ) were part of the September 2008 agreement as they were members of the ProTour at that time, joined the 15 ProTour teams to round out the teams list. Each team entered a squad of nine riders, giving the event a 198-rider peloton at its outset.

The race's 22 teams were:

Non-invitation of Dutch teams
The Giro, like the 2009 Vuelta a España before it and the forthcoming Tour de France, began in the Netherlands. Throughout the season, the two teams tried to prove their combativeness in the hopes of securing Grand Tour invites, trying especially to outdo one another. Since the openings to the Giro and the Tour were partly financed by Dutch tax money, Vacansoleil's team manager called for political help to get invites for his team, but neither Dutch team made it into either the Giro or the Tour. Consequently, neither made the Vuelta a España teams selection, either. The teams' disappointment at their non-invitation led to communications with UCI President Pat McQuaid, which may result in reforms to how teams are selected for the Grand Tours.

Pre-race favorites

The Giro was often described as being wide open in terms of who had the best chance to win it. This is because many notable riders, including the past three champions, did not enter. 2007 Giro d'Italia champion Danilo Di Luca, who originally finished second in the 2009 Giro d'Italia, was suspended by his national federation in February for a doping incident in the 2009 Giro. 2008 Giro d'Italia champion Alberto Contador skipped the Giro to better focus on the Tour de France, as he also had in the previous season. After first indicating that he might defend his championship, 2009 champion Denis Menchov also announced that he would not ride the Giro, instead focusing on the Tour de France, in order to complete the career sweep of the Grand Tours. Lance Armstrong and Levi Leipheimer, leaders of the  squad in the 2009 Giro, announced in October 2009 that they would ride the partially concurrent Tour of California instead of the Giro, which is why  was not selected for the Giro.

Just five days before the race began, the UCI announced several riders were under suspicion of doping by virtue of irregular values in their biological passports. Among them was Franco Pellizotti, who had been set to be one of the leaders for the  team and had been described as a pre-race favorite. While team firmly stood behind Pellizotti in the case and expressed anger that the UCI unveiled their findings so close to the start of the Giro, they obligingly pulled him from their squad. He was replaced by Vincenzo Nibali, who had been planning to ride the Tour of California as a squad leader. While not an overall favorite, Alessandro Ballan intended to participate in the race, stating in October that it was a certainty he would start, after missing out on the Giro in 2009 when he was world champion. Ballan was later suspended by his team as a result of an internal doping investigation, meaning he had to miss the Giro. He was later cleared of any wrongdoing.

Most pre-race analyses identified Ivan Basso, Cadel Evans, and Carlos Sastre as the major favorites to win the overall classification, with Evans perhaps the consensus pick. Basso and Sastre had both ridden the Giro in 2009 and come away finishing in the top five. Sastre also won two difficult mountain stages in the race's final week, and was noted as a rider who gets stronger as a race goes along, making the Giro's very climbing-intensive third week possibly sit in his favor. Evans had finished on a Grand Tour podium in each of the past three seasons, including in the most recent three-week event, the 2009 Vuelta a España. He also entered the race as the reigning world cycling champion and had had a successful 2010 season to date, with a win in La Flèche Wallonne and a podium finish in the Tirreno–Adriatico. Neither Basso nor Sastre had raced much in the 2010 season prior to the Giro. Other riders named as contenders included Bradley Wiggins, former Giro winners Damiano Cunego and Stefano Garzelli, Alexander Vinokourov, Marzio Bruseghin, Christian Vande Velde, Domenico Pozzovivo, David Moncoutié, and Michele Scarponi. Race director Angelo Zomegnan also named Basso, Evans, and Sastre as his three favorites, and included Wiggins and Linus Gerdemann as possible darkhorses.

Mark Cavendish and Daniele Bennati, stage winners in the past two editions of the Giro, were absent from this race, but several top sprinters took the start in Amsterdam. These included Tyler Farrar, André Greipel, and Alessandro Petacchi, all of whom had themselves won Grand Tour stages in 2009 and figured to be top favorites for the Giro's flat stages. Former Tour de France points classification winner Óscar Freire intended to make his Giro debut in this race, but he pulled out due to sinusitis shortly before the race started. Other sprinters in the Giro peloton included Robbie McEwen, Freire's teammate Graeme Brown, Baden Cooke, Leonardo Duque, Sebastian Haedo, Wouter Weylandt, and Greg Henderson.

Route and stages

The Giro's 21 stages were divided into the following classifications by race organizers Gazzetta dello Sport: four time trials (three individual and one team), seven flat stages, five mixed stages, and six mountain stages. The race began in the Netherlands, the ninth time in the Giro's history that the race began outside Italy, and the first since 2006's start in Belgium. A short individual time trial and two flat stages were held there. Starting the race away from Italy meant that an early rest day, coming just three days into the 23-day race, was necessary to transfer to Italy. The first stage upon entering Italy was a team time trial, the fifth consecutive year that discipline had featured in the Giro. Stage 7 visited Tuscany and was raced partly on unpaved roads used yearly in the Italian semi-classic Montepaschi Strade Bianche. The course honored Italian cycling legends Gino Bartali, Fausto Coppi, and Costante Girardengo by passing through their hometowns in the first road race stages in Italy.

Five stages ended with climbs, with most coming in the race's last week. The Stage 16 individual time trial went to Plan de Corones, on a course identical to the one used in the 2008 Giro d'Italia. The Gavia was also the Cima Coppi, the race's highest point, and Stage 20, in which it featured, was considered the queen stage. Other climbs during the race included the Passo del Bratello, Monte Grappa, the Passo delle Palade, the Passo di Santa Cristina, the Forcola di Livigno, and the last climb of the race, the Passo del Tonale. Most of these climbs also featured difficult descents.

The route was noted to appeal to many types of riders, be they climbers, sprinters, or time trialists. The race had seven flat stages which figured into end in mass sprints, and the hilly mixed stages were inviting for breakaways. Sastre, one of the first riders to announce he would ride the Giro, commented that the route was much harder than that of the 2009 Giro, and would demand a very strong climber to be its champion. Zomegnan concurred that the route favored climbers, noting that the distance spent time trialing was not great and that it would take errors from climbing specialists to allow a rider better suited for time trialing to be Giro champion.

Race overview

The Giro began in Amsterdam with an individual time trial. Favorites for the stage included two British riders,  captain Bradley Wiggins and ' David Millar. Several riders in the Giro peloton considered Wiggins the prohibitive favorite. Wiggins won the stage, securing the first pink jersey. A major surprise on the stage was Grand Tour rookie Brent Bookwalter from  coming in second, just 2 seconds off Wiggins' winning time. Millar was seventh, 6 seconds back. This set the stage for a turbulent opening to the Giro, as both of the road race stages in the Netherlands featured several crashes. The courses for the road stages in the Netherlands were noted to have a lot of street furniture on them, which combined with the riders' nerves on the first day of a three-week Grand Tour as well as crosswinds from the North Sea to make the first mass-start stages very perilous. Tyler Farrar, Carlos Sastre, Christian Vande Velde, Greg Henderson, Wiggins, Alessandro Petacchi, Domenico Pozzovivo, Marzio Bruseghin, Filippo Pozzato, and Gilberto Simoni all fell from their bikes at some point while the Giro was in the Netherlands. There were also many other crashes that took down so many riders it was difficult to keep track of exactly who was effected. Crashing and, consequently, falling away from the leading group on the road, meant different things for different riders. For sprinters like Farrar and Petacchi, crashing meant they were unlikely to be able to contest the finishes for stage wins, while overall contenders like Wiggins and Sastre lost time in the general classification. For the second year in a row, Vandevelde suffered a broken collarbone as a result of his crash, consequently abandoning the race. Despite crashing during stage 2, Farrar got up and was able to win the stage from a depleted field sprint. The state of the roads in the Netherlands and the sheer quantity of crashes that took place there incurred much criticism and questions over whether they should be included in a Grand Tour. Cadel Evans and Alexander Vinokourov both took the pink jersey while the Giro was in the Netherlands. Vinokourov held it prior to the transfer to Italy, with six riders from three teams within 10 seconds of him, meaning the pink jersey still remained very much in flux.

After the transfer, the first stage in Italy was a team time trial, a race where each member of the squad races against the clock together, and the team's time is taken for the fifth rider to cross the finish line.  was the winning squad, and had a time gap over Vinokourov's  team that was sufficiently large enough for Vincenzo Nibali to become the fourth race leader in as many stages. At last, there was stability in the race leadership, as Nibali comfortably retained over the next two stages, both of which featured breakaways taking the day's honors while the peloton finished together. Stage 7 was a major one, incorporating stretches of gravel roads near the finish. The day on which this stage was run also happened to have very heavy rainfall, making the course muddy and dangerous. Much like had happened in the Netherlands, a great many riders crashed in this stage, perhaps chief among them Wiggins and Sastre, who both lost more than four minutes. Nibali also crashed, and upon seeing this, Alexander Vinokourov, Damiano Cunego, and Cadel Evans broke free of the leading group. Evans won the stage, one of many riders to cross the finish line covered in mud, and Vinokourov took back the race leadership. Through the first mountain stage and two flat stages that followed, the overall standings did not change much, and Vinokourov retained the jersey.

Stage 11 into L'Aquila provided for major changes to the overall standings. More than 50 riders formed the day's escape group, and they quickly took 20 minutes advantage. Among them were Sastre, Wiggins, and 's Richie Porte, who was holding the white jersey as best young rider and, at sixth overall, was the best-placed man in the group. Sastre, Wiggins, and Porte all had multiple support riders with them in the breakaway who set strenuous paces to keep the group away. The main field, containing the Giro's top favorites, pulled back a little time but was still nearly 13 minutes behind stage winner Evgeni Petrov at the finish. The day's result massively shuffled the overall classification. Porte was the only rider who had been in the top ten before the stage who remained there afterward, and took the pink jersey. Sastre and Wiggins, who entered the Giro as contenders but had fallen well back in the overall standings before this stage, both moved back into the top ten.

Porte kept the pink jersey for two days, conceding it to David Arroyo, a fellow member of the L'Aquila breakaway, on stage 14 when he could not climb Monte Grappa with the leaders on the day. On this stage, the race's overall favorites began to creep back into the top of the overall classification, as previous race leaders Nibali, Vinokourov, and Evans assumed 8th through 10th in the standings. There were again great changes to the overall classification in stage 15, by way of the climb up Monte Zoncolan. Ivan Basso won the stage and greatly reduced his deficit to Arroyo, though the Spaniard still held the pink jersey after this stage. Evans, Scarponi, Vinokourov, and Nibali also finished well-placed and moved up. Wiggins again fell out of contention, this time conclusively so, by losing 25 minutes on the climb. Evans turned in the best ride of the pre-race favorites in the Plan de Corones time trial, closing his deficit to Basso and moving past Sastre in the overall. After this stage, the only riders left in the top ten from the L'Aquila breakaway were Arroyo, Porte, Sastre, and Robert Kišerlovski, who all finished the Giro in the top ten.

After a stage each for the breakaway and the sprinters, during which there were no major changes to the overall standings, the riders were faced with the very climbing-intensive final two road stages. The  team rode a very hard tempo in stage 19 over the Passo del Mortirolo, which eventually whittled that group down to just Basso, Nibali, and Scarponi. They crossed the Mortirolo more than two minutes ahead of Arroyo, which was nearly enough time to make Basso the virtual race leader. Arroyo, noted as a far better descender than Basso, took very aggressive lines coming down the Mortirolo and caught up with Vinokourov, Sastre, Evans, and John Gadret, who had been between him and the leading trio. Basso's group had only 30 seconds on Arroyo's at the start of the stage-concluding Aprica climb, but they took more and more time as the climb went on and finished three minutes ahead, giving Basso the pink jersey with two days left to race. Arroyo elected not to try to aggressively descend any of the four large climbs on course in the final road race stage, settling for second place by riding with Basso and the other top riders in the peloton most of the day. There were a few changes in time gaps, but the same riders remained in the top ten from the previous day, as Johan Tschopp won the stage from a breakaway. The individual time trial in Verona which closed out the Giro also provided for small changes to the overall, but Basso's 15th place on the stage was easily enough to make him Giro champion. Arroyo and Nibali rounded out the podium.

Australian riders won each of the lesser jersey awards. Evans won the points classification, represented in 2010 with a red jersey in a return to the original colour scheme for the three minor classifications that reflected the colours of the Italian flag. Evans's victory came about by way of nine top-ten finishes, including a stage win, over the course of the race. This classification was tightly contested throughout the race; six different riders held the jersey, and it changed hands nine times. Matthew Lloyd of  won the green jersey for the mountains classification, taking maximum mountains points during his stage-winning breakaway in stage 6. He made morning breakaways later on in mountain stages to take points on other climbs and consolidate his lead. Porte won the white jersey as best young rider, holding it for all but three stages. Success was widespread among the 22 teams in the race. In sharp contrast to the 2009 Giro, the only rider to win multiple stages in this year's race was Farrar, who took the sprint finishes to stages 2 and 10. 's Chris Anker Sørensen won stage 8 on Monte Terminillo after figuring into a morning breakaway, and their time trial specialist Gustav Larsson won the final race against the clock in Verona.  won multiple sprint stages, first with leadout man Matthew Goss when ace sprinter André Greipel missed out on the opportunity, and later Greipel himself took a win.  took back-to-back stage wins, first with Petrov in L'Aquila and then with Filippo Pozzato, who won a 10-man sprint after a late breakaway in stage 12. After there had been no Italian stage winners for the first 11 days of racing, Pozzato's stage win was the first of five in a row and six overall for Italian riders. Nibali and Basso were among those stage winners; as they also won the stage 4 team time trial, theirs was the only squad with more than two stage wins. They also won both teams classifications, the time-based Trofeo Fast Team and the points-based Trofeo Super Team.

Classification leadership
In the 2010 Giro d'Italia, four different jerseys were awarded. For the general classification, calculated by adding each cyclist's finishing times on each stage, and allowing time bonuses for the first three finishers on mass-start stages, the leader received a pink jersey. This classification was considered the most important of the Giro d'Italia, and the winner was considered the winner of the Giro.

Additionally, there was a points classification, which awarded a red jersey. In the points classification, cyclists got points for finishing in the top 15 in a stage. Unlike in the better known points classification in the Tour de France, the type of stage had no effect on what points were on offer – each stage had the same points available on the same scale. The win earned 25 points, second place earned 20 points, third 16, fourth 14, fifth 12, sixth 10, and one point fewer per place down to a single point for 15th. In addition, points could be won in intermediate sprints.

There was also a mountains classification, the leadership of which was marked by a green jersey. In the mountains classifications, points were won by reaching the top of a climb before other cyclists. Each climb was categorized as either first, second, or third category, with more points available for the higher-categorized climbs. The Cima Coppi, the race's highest point of elevation, awarded still more points than the other first-category climbs.

The fourth jersey represented the young rider classification, marked by a white jersey. This was decided the same way as the general classification, but only riders born after 1 January 1985 were eligible.

There were also three classifications for teams. In the Trofeo Fast Team classification, the times of the best three cyclists per team on each stage were added; the leading team was the team with the lowest total time; the Trofeo Super Team was a team points classification, with the top 20 placed riders on each stage earning points (20 for first place, 19 for second place and so on, down to a single point for 20th) for their team; and the Fair Play classification rewarded those teams that best avoided penalty points for minor technical infringements.

The rows in the following table correspond to the jerseys awarded after that stage was run.

Final standings

General classification

Points classification

Mountains classification

Young rider classification

Trofeo Fast Team classification

Trofeo Super Team classification

Minor classifications
Other less well-known classifications, whose leaders did not receive a special jersey, were awarded during the Giro. These awards were based on points earned throughout the three weeks of the tour. Each mass-start stage had one intermediate sprint, the Traguardo Volante, or T.V. The T.V. gave bonus seconds towards the general classification, points towards the regular points classification, and also points towards the T.V. classification. This award was known in previous years as the "Intergiro" and the "Expo Milano 2015" classification. It was won by Tom Stamsnijder of the  team.

Other awards included the Combativity classification, which was a compilation of points gained for position on crossing intermediate sprints, mountain passes and stage finishes. Mountains classification winner Matthew Lloyd won this award. The Azzurri d'Italia classification was based on finishing order, but points were awarded only to the top three finishers in each stage. It was won, like the closely associated points classification, by Cadel Evans. Additionally, the Premio della Fuga rewarded riders who took part in a breakaway at the head of the field, each rider in an escape of ten or fewer riders getting one point for each kilometre that the group stayed clear. 's Jérôme Pineau was first in this competition. Teams were given penalty points for minor technical infringements.  was most successful in avoiding penalties, and so won the Fair Play classification.

World Rankings points
The Giro was one of 26 events throughout the season that contributed points towards the 2010 UCI World Ranking. Points were awarded to the top 20 finishers overall, and to the top five finishers in each stage.

References

Footnotes

Citations

External links

  
   – Updated faster than the English version
 cyclingnews.com – Race reports and news features
 velonews.com Giro results, report and photos

 
Giro d'Italia by year
Giro d'Italia
Giro d'Italia
Giro d'Italia
May 2010 sports events in Europe